Krutoy Ovrag is a rural locality (a village) in Tolpukhovskoye Rural Settlement, Sobinsky District, Vladimir Oblast, Russia. The population was 1 as of 2010.

Geography 
Krutoy Ovrag is located 30 km northeast of Sobinka (the district's administrative centre) by road. Azikovo is the nearest rural locality.

References 

Rural localities in Sobinsky District